Sex, Drugs & Bill Monroe is a 2008 album by Kentucky-based cowpunk band Nine Pound Hammer. The album is named after Bill Monroe, a prominent bluegrass musician from Kentucky.

Track listing
I'm Yer Huckelberry (2:15)
Hookers And Hot Sauce (2:10)
Black Sheep (2:37)
Everybody's Drunk (2:37)
Fightin' Words (1:39)
Mama's Doin' Meth Again (2:28)
Right To Do You Wrong (2:06)
Road Hard (2:28)
Too Sorry To Shit (1:57)
Hell In My Hand (3:06)
Wheels Flew Off Last Night (2:26)
Ain't Worth Killin' (2:18)
Cookin' The Corn (2:45)
The Way It Is (2:41)

2008 albums
Nine Pound Hammer albums